Grivele may refer to the following rivers in Romania:

 Grivele, a tributary of the Șușița in Gorj County
 Grivele, a tributary of the Surpata in Hunedoara County